Hani Najm A'deen Awadh Bait Saleem Al-Sabti (born 27 April 1993), commonly known as Hani Al-Sabti, is an Omani footballer who plays for Dhofar S.C.S.C. in Oman Professional League.

Club career
On 8 June 2014, he signed a one-year contract extension with Dhofar S.C.S.C.

International career
Hani was selected for the national team for the first time in 2013. He earned his first international cap for Oman on 29 February 2012 against Thailand in a 2014 FIFA World Cup qualification match. He has represented the national team in 2014 FIFA World Cup qualification and the 2013 Gulf Cup of Nations.

Honours

Club
Dhofar S.C.S.C.
Omani League (1): 2004-05; Runners-up 2007-08, 2008-09, 2009-10
Sultan Qaboos Cup (3): 2004, 2006, 2011; Runners-up 2009
Oman Professional League Cup (1): 2012–13; Runners-up 2014–15
Oman Super Cup (0): Runners-up 2005, 2012
Baniyas SC International Tournament (1): Winners 2014

References

External links
 
 
 
 

1984 births
Living people
People from Salalah
Omani footballers
Association football goalkeepers
Dhofar Club players
Oman Professional League players
Oman international footballers